Evelina Fernández (born April 28, 1954) is an American playwright and actress from Los Angeles.

Early life and education 
Fernández is a second generation Mexican-American. Fernández's grandparents immigrated to the United States in 1910 from Jalisco, to escape civil war. Fernández was born in Los Angeles but lived the first nine years of her life in Arizona before returning to live with her grandparents after her parents got divorced.

Fernández first got involved in drama in the Garfield High School Drama Club. She then attended California State University, Los Angeles, where she continued to pursue theater and became involved in the Chicano Movement. Evelina was a founding member of the Latino Theatre Company (LTC) in 1985. She has remained involved for 30 years, writing several and performing in a dozen plays for the LTC. The LTC currently has a 20-year lease with the City of Los Angeles to operate in the Los Angeles Theater Center (LATC).

Career 
Her first prominent role as an actress came in Luis Valdez's Zootsuit in 1978. The play was the first play with a Chicano to be shown on Broadway however, Fernández was pregnant with her first child, Fidel, and could not perform in the Broadway production. After Zootsuit, Fernández performed for El Teatro de Esperanza, performing at both the New York Shakespeare Festival and the Denver Center for the Performing Arts. Fernández then performed as Julie in American Me, a film about Chicano gang life and the prison system in the United States. She has since appeared as an actress in 28 movies, shows and film shorts.

A theme of her work is to fight the common representation of Latino/a characters as victims. Her frustration with the portrayal of Latino/a characters prompted her to write Luminarias, released in May 2000. Luminarias is a commentary about race, sex and love from the perspective of single, chicana women. In addition to writing Luminarias, Fernández also produced and starred in the film as the actress of one of the protagonists, Andrea.

Fernández wrote a loosely autobiographical trilogy called A Mexican Trilogy, which were put on at the LATC by the LTC. The Trilogy is made up of Faith, Hope and Charity. The titles were intended to be the names of the protagonists but in the end, were the themes of each of the play.

Awards 
Fernández has received several awards for her work. In 1998, she won the American Latino Media Arts Award for her work in the movie Hollywood Confidential. In 2007 she was nominated for the Humanitas Prize for her work on an episode of the T.V. series Maya and Miguel. In 2000, the year that Luminarias was released, Fernández won the Nosotros Golden Eagle Awards for Outstanding Writer. Two of her works, Solitude and Dementia have made the Los Angeles Times Critic's Choice list. Evelina has received two Ted Schmitt Awards from The Los Angeles Drama Critics Circle for A Mexican Trilogy: An American Story and The Mother of Henry.

Personal life 
Fernandez is married to the artistic director and one of the founders of the Latino Theater Company, Jose Luis Valenzuela. Jose has directed many of the plays that Evelina has written and starred in. Valenzuela and Fernández have two children and live in Los Angeles.

Filmography

Acting

Film

Television

Writing

Film

Television

References

External links

21st-century American dramatists and playwrights
Living people
Writers from Los Angeles
Hispanic and Latino American dramatists and playwrights
American writers of Mexican descent
1954 births